Namsan Station is a station of Daegu Subway Line 3 in Namsan-dong, and Namsanno, Jung District, Daegu, South Korea. It is named after Namsan-dong. Its station subname is Gyemyeongnegeori.

See also 
 Keimyung University

Daegu Metro stations
Jung District, Daegu
Railway stations opened in 2015
2015 establishments in South Korea